The Maritime Professional Hockey League (MaPHL) was a professional men's ice hockey league operating in New Brunswick and Nova Scotia from around 1911 until 1914. Two of the league's champions challenged for the Stanley Cup. The league was preceded in 1910–11 by the Interprovincial Professional Hockey League and followed in 1914–15 by the Eastern Professional Hockey League.

History

Originally the Maritime Hockey League, the loop was created as an amateur ice hockey league operating in Nova Scotia around 1900. The league is notable for having several teams challenge for the Stanley Cup.

Stanley Cup Challengers:

 1900 – Halifax Crescents
 1906 – New Glasgow Cubs

As part of the general progression of elite ice hockey leagues to paid professionals in the time period around 1910, the league made the switch official in 1910, calling itself the Interprovincial Professional Hockey League. The name changed again in 1911 to the Maritime Professional Hockey League and once again in 1914 to the Eastern Professional Hockey League. The EPHL suspended operations on February 7, 1915 after having shrunk to only two teams. 

Two MaPHL champions went on to challenge the NHA champion for the Stanley Cup:

 1912 – Moncton Victorias
 1913 – Sydney Millionaires

In September 1913, the MaPHL arranged with the NHA and the Pacific Coast Hockey Association (PCHA) for the formation of a hockey commission to govern inter-league operations, contract issues and the play of the Stanley Cup between the league champions. In 1914, it was expected that the MaPHL champion would play the Toronto Blueshirts of the NHA for the Stanley Cup, but this was cancelled and Maritime champions did not play for the Stanley Cup again.

1910–11 season

1911–12 season
The Halifax Socials joined the three teams from the IPHL: the Moncton Victorias, the New Glasgow Cubs, and the Halifax Crescents. Each team played the other three teams six times, three home, three away.

Note: W = Wins, L = Losses, T = Ties, GF= Goals For, GA = Goals Against, Pts = Points

1912–13 season
The Sydney Millionaires join the league making five teams that play the others four times each, two home, two away. After the season, the Millionaires would make an unsuccessful challenge against the Quebec Bulldogs for the Stanley Cup.

1913–14 season
The New Glasgow Cubs are renamed the New Glasgow Black Foxes. The Moncton Victorias fold bringing the league back to four teams, each playing the others eight times, four home, four away. The Millionaires do not play a planned Stanley Cup challenge against the Toronto Blueshirts.

1914–15 season

Teams
 Glace Bay Miners – 1914–1915
 Halifax Crescents – 1910–1914
 Halifax Socials – 1911–1914
 Moncton Victorias – 1910–1913
 New Glasgow Cubs – 1910–1913
 New Glasgow Black Foxes – 1913–1915
 Sydney Millionaires – 1912–1915

See also

 List of Stanley Cup champions

Notes

References
 
Maritime Professional Hockey League history

Defunct ice hockey leagues in New Brunswick
Defunct ice hockey leagues in Nova Scotia
Defunct ice hockey leagues in Canada
Sport in the Maritimes
1911 establishments in Canada
1914 disestablishments in Canada
Sports leagues established in 1911
Sports leagues disestablished in 1914